180 George Street (also known as the Charles and George Towers) is a residential skyscraper complex currently under-construction in Parramatta. New South Wales, Australia. The complex is being developed by property developer Meriton, with the towers being designed by Woods Bagot. Initial proposals were first lodged in 2016, with final approval being given in October 2019. Construction commenced in the same year and upon completion, the towers will become the tallest residential buildings in the suburb of Parramatta. The complex consists of the north tower, standing at a height of 213 metres (699 ft) and the south tower, standing at a height of 189 metres (620 ft). It will contain 553 residential dwellings, while the hotel component will comprise 346 rooms. The north tower topped out in July 2022, while the south tower topped out in November 2022.

References 

Residential skyscrapers in Australia
Residential buildings in New South Wales
Hotels in New South Wales
Twin towers